Knoxville was an independent Minor League Baseball team that played in the Tennessee–Alabama League in 1904. They were located in Knoxville, Tennessee, and played their home games at Baldwin Park.

The team was preceded in Knoxville by the Knoxville Indians, who played in 1897. Knoxville played its first game in the Tennessee–Alabama League on May 16, 1904, defeating Chattanooga, 7–4. They defeated Bristol, 6–1, in the season finale on August 20. Knoxville won the pennant with a 49–29 (.628) first-place finish.

The city did not field another club until the Knoxville Appalachians began play in 1909.

Notable players

The only Knoxville player to also compete in Major League Baseball during his career was Pryor McElveen, who played with the Brooklyn Superbas/Dodgers from 1909 to 1911.

References

External links 
Statistics from Baseball-Reference
Statistics from Stats Crew

1904 establishments in Tennessee
1904 disestablishments in Tennessee
Baseball teams established in 1904
Baseball teams disestablished in 1904
Defunct baseball teams in Tennessee
Defunct minor league baseball teams
Professional baseball teams in Tennessee
Sports in Knoxville, Tennessee